Westbrook is a surname. Notable people with the name include:

 Brian Westbrook, an American football player
 Bryant Westbrook, an American football player
 Byron Westbrook, an American football player
 Chris I. Westbrook, French physicist
 Danniella Westbrook, an actress and television hostess
 Dawn Westbrook, alias of Dawn Sime
 Dede Westbrook, American football player
 Helen Searles Westbrook (1889-1967) American composer and organist
 Jake Westbrook, baseball player
 Jeff Westbrook, a TV writer and algorithms researcher
 John Westbrook, American football player and pastor
 Karimah Westbrook (born 1978), American actress
 Kate Westbrook, a British singer/songwriter 
 Lawrence Westbrook, an American college basketball player
 Mary Westbrook or Mary Westbrook Van Deusen (1829–1908), American author
 Michael Westbrook, a former American football player
 Mike Westbrook, a British composer and bandleader
 Richard Westbrook, British racing driver
 Russell Westbrook, American basketball player
 Ruth Westbrook, English cricketer
 Scarlett Westbrook (born 2004), British climate justice activist and journalist
 Thomas Westbrook, Colonial New England militia leader and namesake for Westbrook, Maine
 Tati Westbrook, American internet personality

See also 
 John Westbrooke (1616–1666), English landowner and politician
 Zain Westbrooke (born 1996), English footballer
 Wesbrook, surname